Alytarchia leonina is a moth of the family Erebidae. It was described by Francis Walker in 1865. It is found in the Democratic Republic of the Congo, the Gambia, Malawi, Nigeria, Sierra Leone, South Africa, Uganda as well as in India and Sri Lanka.

References

Moths described in 1865
Moths of Africa
Moths of Asia
Moths of Sri Lanka
Nyctemerina